The 1934 Cambridge by-election was held on 8 February 1934.  The by-election was held due to the elevation to the peerage of the incumbent Conservative MP, George Newton.  It was won by the Conservative candidate Richard Tufnell.

References

1934 elections in the United Kingdom
1934 in England
20th century in Cambridge
February 1934 events
Politics of Cambridge
By-elections to the Parliament of the United Kingdom in Cambridgeshire constituencies